Goranac may refer to:

 Goranac dialect
 Goranci